Bøvågen is a small village in Alver municipality, Vestland county, Norway.  It's located on the northern part of the island of Radøy.  From 1924 until 1964, it was the administrative centre of the former municipality of Hordabø.  Hordabø Church is located in the village.

Bøvågen has had various industry over the years. Originally it was a fishing village, but more recently it has been home to a plant belonging to the industrial company Sverre Munck Elektro-Mekanisk Industri.

References

Villages in Vestland
Alver (municipality)